Jane Audry Koomar (1954 – February 24, 2013) was a 20th- and 21st-century American scholar, educator, occupational therapist, developmental psychologist and author. She co-founded OTA–Watertown, an occupational therapy-focused organization, in 1983. Today, now known as OTA The Koomar Center, it is the world's largest organization of its kind. 

She was president of both OTA–Watertown and its offshoot, the SPIRAL Foundation.

Koomar also had over twenty works published, including Answers to Questions Teachers Ask About Sensory Integration.

Early life and career 
Koomar was born in Lakewood, Ohio, to Michael and Audry Koomar.

In her teenage years, she started a daycare-style babysitting service for families in her neighborhood.

Koomar received a bachelor's degree in occupational therapy from Ohio State University. This was followed by a master's degree and PhD in developmental pyschology at Boston University. She was also an assistant professor in occupational therapy.

She also studied under Dr. Anna Jean Ayres and Ginny Scardinia.

Early in her career as a therapist, Koomar, who was a fellow of the American Occupational Therapy Association, worked on strategies to introduce sensory integration therapy into the public-school system of Cambridge, Massachusetts.

In 1983, she founded OTA–Watertown in a former school building on Washington Street in Watertown, Massachusetts. Today, it is the world's largest organization of its kind.

Koomar was Professor of Practice at Tufts University, Boston School of Occupational Therapy, during a one-year stint.

Shortly after Koomar's death, OTA–Watertown moved a few miles away, to Bridge Street in Newton, Massachusetts, and was re-named OTA The Koomar Center in her honor. Sarah Sawyer became the new clinical director of the company.

Personal life 
Koomar married John Lafarriere, with whom she had a son and a daughter. The family lived in Bedford, Massachusetts.

Death 
Koomer died on February 24, 2013, after being diagnosed with breast cancer three years earlier.

References 

1954 births
2013 deaths
People from Lakewood, Ohio
People from Bedford, Massachusetts
Ohio State University alumni
Boston University alumni
Tufts University faculty
American educators
Occupational therapists